The 2003 Vaahteraliiga season was the 24th season of the highest level of American football in Finland. The regular season took place between May 31 and August 11, 2003. The Finnish champion was determined in the playoffs and at the championship game Vaahteramalja XXIV the Turku Trojans won the Helsinki Roosters.

Standings

Playoffs

References 

American football in Finland
Vaahteraliiga
Vaahteraliiga